Novy Chechen is a rural locality (a selo) in Bryansky Selsoviet, Kizlyarsky District, Republic of Dagestan, Russia. The population was 171 as of 2010. There is 1 street.

Geography 
Novy Chechen is located 60 km northeast of Kizlyar (the district's administrative centre) by road. Novye Bukhty and Bolshaya Areshevka are the nearest rural localities.

Nationalities 
Dargins, Avars and Russians live there.

References 

Rural localities in Kizlyarsky District